Drycothaea viridescens is a species of beetle in the family Cerambycidae. It was described by Buquet in 1857. It is known from Argentina, Brazil and Paraguay.

References

Calliini
Beetles described in 1857